Armands Uščins (6 October 1973) is a Latvian handball coach of the Latvian national team.

He coached the Latvian team at the 2020 European Men's Handball Championship.

References

1973 births
Living people
Handball coaches of international teams